Andrey Ivanovich Karpenko (born 12 July 1966) is a Russian professional association football functionary and a former player.

External links
 

1966 births
People from Balakovo
Living people
Soviet footballers
Russian footballers
Association football defenders
Russian Premier League players
FC Fakel Voronezh players
FC Tekstilshchik Kamyshin players
FC Khimik-Arsenal players
FC Znamya Truda Orekhovo-Zuyevo players
Sportspeople from Saratov Oblast